Christopher Robert Pronger ( or ; born October 10, 1974) is a Canadian former professional ice hockey defenceman and a former advisor to the Florida Panthers of the National Hockey League (NHL).

Originally selected second overall by the Hartford Whalers in the 1993 NHL Entry Draft, Pronger has played for Hartford, the St. Louis Blues, Edmonton Oilers and Anaheim Ducks before being traded to the Philadelphia Flyers before the 2009–10 season. He was captain of the Blues, Ducks and Flyers. He has appeared in the Stanley Cup finals with three different teams (Edmonton, Anaheim and Philadelphia), winning the Cup with the Ducks in 2007. Pronger won the Hart Memorial Trophy as the NHL's most valuable player for the 1999–2000 season, becoming the first defenceman to win the award since Bobby Orr in 1971–72. A mainstay on Team Canada, Pronger won Olympic gold medals at the 2002 and 2010 Winter Olympics and is a member of the Triple Gold Club. In 2017, he was named one of the "100 Greatest NHL Players" in history.

Pronger's playing career ended in November 2011 due to post-concussion syndrome related to three separate hits suffered during his career; he also suffers from vision impairment due to being hit in the eye(s) by the blade of another player's stick. In October 2014, Pronger signed a contract with the NHL to assist its Player Safety Division, and he assists the NHL's Player Safety Division involving St. Louis Blues.

Pronger was suspended eight times during his NHL career.

The St. Louis Blues retired Pronger's No. 44 on January 17, 2022.

Playing career

Early years
Pronger was born in Dryden, Ontario, to Jim and Eila Pronger, an immigrant from Pori, Finland. Before entering the junior ranks in Ontario, he grew up playing minor hockey in his hometown. As a 15-year-old, he was identified through the Ontario U-17 program and signed with the Stratford Cullitons Jr. B (OHA) club for the 1990–91 season. One of his defence partners in Stratford was future NHLer Greg de Vries.

In May 1991, Pronger indicated he was going to join his older brother Sean at Bowling Green State University to play in the NCAA instead of opting to play in the Ontario Hockey League (OHL). Regardless of his pre-draft indications, the Peterborough Petes selected Pronger in the sixth round in the OHL Priority Selection. Contrary to his initial intentions, Pronger reported to Peterborough.

After two stand-out seasons with Peterborough, and because of being highly regarded for his rare combination of imposing size, speed, offensive skill (particularly on the power play) and physicality, Pronger was selected second overall by the Hartford Whalers in the 1993 NHL Entry Draft, behind Alexandre Daigle, who made the infamous statement, "I'm glad I got drafted first, because no one remembers number two."

Hartford Whalers
Pronger made his debut in the 1993–94 NHL season, playing 81 games for the Whalers and earning a spot on the NHL All-Rookie Team. However, he was one of multiple Whalers that season with off-ice issues, being one of six players arrested for a barroom brawl in Buffalo in late March (the brawl also involved a Whalers assistant coach), and then being arrested for drunk driving in Ohio three days after his rookie season ended, leading some to consider Pronger impatient and immature. On his rookie season, then-teammate Kelly Chase said, "You could see [Pronger] had talent, but it was a ho-hum thing. He really didn't have any direction. He was under a lot of pressure and just wasn't ready for the responsibility. Of course that team wasn't exactly overloaded with players who knew how to win" (the Whalers finished second-last in the Eastern Conference that season). After a second season in Hartford, on July 27, 1995, he was traded to the St. Louis Blues in exchange for star forward Brendan Shanahan.

St. Louis Blues
In the early years of his St. Louis career, Pronger played under coach and general manager Mike Keenan, who insisted he improve his conditioning and reduce his mistakes. Late in his first season in St. Louis, the acquisition of Wayne Gretzky took pressure off Pronger which, combined with Keenan's practices, allowed Pronger to concentrate on improving his defensive play.

In his third season with St. Louis and first as team captain, Pronger was again named to the All-Star team. That year during the 1998 Stanley Cup playoffs, he had a cardiac arrest caused by commotio cordis when he was hit in the chest with a puck in a game against the Detroit Red Wings. Prior to this, he played for the Canadian Olympic team in Nagano. In 1999–2000, Pronger recorded a career-high 62 points and a +52 rating. His efforts won him the Norris and Hart trophies at the end of the season. Pronger beat Art Ross winner Jaromír Jágr by just one point in Hart Trophy voting, which was, at the time, the smallest margin of victory in the history of the award. (Two years later, Jarome Iginla and José Théodore tied in overall voting; Théodore won with more first-place votes.)  Pronger was also named to the first All-Star team.

Pronger scored 47 points the next season, but appeared in only 51 games due to injury problems. In February 2002, he won a gold medal with the Team Canada at the Winter Olympics in Salt Lake City. That same year in the NHL, he had another fine season and played in the All-Star Game once again. But injuries became a problem again in 2002–03, limiting him to just five games played, during which time Al MacInnis replaced him as captain. Pronger bounced back with another quality season in 2003–04. Following the 2004–05 NHL lockout and the imposition of an NHL salary cap, the Blues traded Pronger to the Edmonton Oilers in exchange for defencemen Eric Brewer, Jeff Woywitka and Doug Lynch. While the Blues needed to reduce team salaries to make it easier to sell the team, the Oilers were able to sign Pronger to a five-year, $31.25 million contract.

Edmonton Oilers
Pronger was selected to play for Team Canada at the 2006 Winter Olympics, marking his third consecutive Olympic Games. The Oilers went to the Stanley Cup Finals that same year. On June 5, 2006, in Game 1 of the Stanley Cup Finals against the Carolina Hurricanes, Pronger became the first player in NHL history to score a penalty shot goal in a Stanley Cup Final game. The Oilers lost in Game 7, with Pronger scoring a team-high 21 points (5 goals and 16 assists) in 24 playoff games, as well as a team-leading plus/minus rating of +10 during the playoffs.

On June 23, 2006, Pronger requested a trade through his agent, Pat Morris, from the Edmonton Oilers. Edmonton GM Kevin Lowe said the request was due to personal reasons, while media outlets reported that Pronger's wife, Lauren, was not happy in Edmonton. The controversy surrounding Pronger's trade request has led many to describe him as "Public Enemy No. 1" in Edmonton. 
On July 3, Pronger was traded to the Anaheim Ducks in exchange for forward Joffrey Lupul, defensive prospect Ladislav Šmíd, Anaheim's 2007 first-round draft pick (traded to the Phoenix Coyotes, which selected Nick Ross), a conditional first-round draft pick (contingent on the Ducks reaching the Stanley Cup Finals within the next three seasons, which they did; the pick was used to select Jordan Eberle), and Anaheim's 2008 second-round draft pick (later traded to the New York Islanders).

Anaheim Ducks

In 2007, Pronger played an important role for the Ducks run as they won the Stanley Cup. It was also Pronger's second-straight finals appearance. During the Conference Finals, Pronger was suspended for one game for a check on Detroit Red Wings winger Tomas Holmström. He later criticized the Canadian media's coverage of the incident. In the final round, Pronger was suspended for one game for elbowing Ottawa Senators winger Dean McAmmond in the head during Game 3. With the Stanley Cup victory, he became a member of the Triple Gold Club.

On September 28, 2007, Pronger was named captain of the Ducks, replacing Scott Niedermayer, who sat out the beginning of the 2007–08 season. Although Niedermayer returned to the lineup later in the season, Pronger remained captain until the start of next season, when Niedermayer was renamed captain. Pronger retained a role as alternate captain.

On March 12, 2008, Pronger was involved in an incident with Vancouver's Ryan Kesler. Pronger, after being tangled up with Kesler behind the Anaheim blue line, stomped unnecessarily on Kesler's leg. Kesler was not injured and upon initial review the NHL did not suspend Pronger. However, upon new video evidence which provided a better angle, the NHL again reviewed the incident and issued Pronger an eight-game suspension. The suspension was criticized by some as insufficient, as Chris Simon had received a 30-game suspension for a stomp earlier that season, with some suggesting the NHL gave preferential treatment towards Pronger as an NHL MVP and an "ambassador for the game". He returned to the ice April 6 against the Phoenix Coyotes in Anaheim's last regular-season game of the year.

The 2008–09 season was quite successful for Pronger, who played his 1,000th career game on February 20, 2009. The Ducks would rally late in the season to jump into eighth place of the Western Conference. They dispatched the Presidents' Trophy-winning San Jose Sharks in six games before falling to the Detroit Red Wings in seven games. Pronger had 2 goals and 8 assists in 13 playoff games.

Philadelphia Flyers
On June 27, 2009, Pronger along with forward Ryan Dingle was traded to the Philadelphia Flyers in exchange for Joffrey Lupul (earlier traded to Edmonton for Pronger in 2006), defenceman Luca Sbisa, two first-round draft picks and a conditional third-round draft pick. Ten days later, Pronger signed a seven-year contract extension. Nearly a month after signing, the NHL announced they had launched an investigation on Pronger's contract to determine whether it circumvented the NHL collective bargaining agreement's salary cap. Because the contract was front-loaded, with annual salaries of just $525,000 in the final two years and was set to expire when Pronger turned 42, the investigation was launched with the focus on the potential for negotiations between Pronger and the Flyers to retire before the contract expired. However, as Pronger's contract took effect after his 35th birthday, under the terms of the current collective bargaining agreement, his over-35 contract cannot be deleted from the Flyers' cap space unless he is placed on long-term injured reserve, and even then it would come back on the team's cap space during the off-season.

On December 30, 2009, Pronger was selected to play for Team Canada at the 2010 Winter Olympics in Vancouver. He served as one of the team's alternate captains, along with Sidney Crosby and Jarome Iginla. The team won the gold medal that year. After playing in his 25th Olympic game for Canada on February 28, 2010, Pronger became Canada's all-time leader in Olympic games played.

In the NHL regular season, the Flyers qualified for the 2010 playoffs on the last day of the season with a shootout win against the New York Rangers. A playoff run marked by an upset of the New Jersey Devils, a historic comeback against the Boston Bruins from down three games to none in the series and a five-game win over the Montreal Canadiens culminated in the Flyers playing the Chicago Blackhawks in the 2010 Stanley Cup Finals. Although the Flyers lost the series four games to two, Pronger had a strong playoff performance and led a team that traded for him to the Finals for the third time in a row. Conversely, no team that traded Pronger away qualified for the playoffs the following year.

Following the playoffs, Pronger underwent arthroscopic knee surgery. He missed the first two games of the  season.  Various other injuries would limit Pronger to just 50 games, marking the first time that he missed significant time since the  season (when he missed 77 games). On September 16, 2011, Pronger was named the 18th captain in Flyers history, replacing Mike Richards (who was traded to the Los Angeles Kings just prior to the 2011 NHL Entry Draft). On Oct. 24, 2011, Maple Leafs center Mikhail Grabovski caught Pronger’s right eye with his stick while following through on a shot. He would miss the next six games with a serious eye injury and concussion. Multiple hits resulting in post-concussion syndrome (the last being a collision with Martin Hanzal) limited Pronger to 13 games for the season in mid-December, placing Pronger's playing career in jeopardy. He also continued to have problems in his right eye.

With a resumption of his playing career looking unlikely, Pronger stepped down as team captain and was succeeded by Claude Giroux on January 15, 2013. However, Pronger did not officially retire from the NHL because his contract ran through to the 2016–17 season. Under the terms of the NHL collective bargaining agreement, because he was at least 35 years old before the contract began, the Flyers were on the hook for the $4.9 million cost against the salary cap each season, though they were able to receive relief by placing Pronger on long-term injured reserve at the start of each season. Had Pronger formally retired, the Flyers would lose that ability and his contract amount would have counted in full against the cap and he would not receive the remainder of the amounts owed to him under the contract ($12.15 million at the start of the 2013–14 season). 
 While no longer playing, Pronger remained with the Flyers organization helping to scout and interview prospects.

On June 27, 2015, the Philadelphia Flyers traded Pronger's playing rights (alongside Nicklas Grossmann) to the Arizona Coyotes in exchange for Sam Gagner and a conditional draft pick. The deal was made to the benefit of salary cap implications to each club, as Pronger never played for Arizona. Three days later, on June 30, 2015, he was named to the Hockey Hall of Fame; because the Hall only counts games played as its criteria for the minimum waiting period, Pronger was eligible for induction even though he was still technically an active player, as he had not played a game in three full seasons at the time of his induction.

Post-playing career
After his contract expired following the 2017 NHL Entry Draft, on June 22, Pronger was able to officially retire and he signed with the Florida Panthers to become the organization's senior advisor of hockey operations.

Personal life

Pronger married his wife Lauren in 1999, and together the couple have three children. He lived in Irvine, California, while playing for the Anaheim Ducks. Pronger now resides in Chesterfield, Missouri where he runs a luxury travel agency alongside his wife.

Pronger appeared on the cover of NHL 2000 and NHL Hitz 2003.
 
His older brother is former NHL player Sean Pronger.

Career statistics

Regular season and playoffs

International

All-Star Games

Awards and achievements

Trivia

Suspensions
Oct. 29, 1995: with St. Louis — four games, slashing (Washington's Pat Peake)
Dec. 17, 1998: with St. Louis — four games, high stick (Phoenix's Jeremy Roenick)
Oct. 11, 2000: with St. Louis — one game, leaving bench for altercation (Los Angeles' Kelly Buchberger)
April 3, 2002: with St. Louis — two games, cross-check (Dallas' Brenden Morrow)
March 14, 2004: with St. Louis — one game, kicking (Calgary's Ville Nieminen)
May 15, 2007: with Anaheim — one playoff game, blow to the head (Detroit's Tomas Holmstrom)
June 3, 2007: with Anaheim — one playoff game, blow to the head (Ottawa's Dean McAmmond)
March 12, 2008: with Anaheim — eight games, stomping on the leg (Vancouver's Ryan Kesler)

Transactions
 June 26, 1993 – Drafted by the Hartford Whalers in the first round, second overall.
 July 27, 1995 – Traded to the St. Louis Blues for Brendan Shanahan.
 August 3, 2005 – Traded to the Edmonton Oilers for Eric Brewer, Jeff Woywitka and Doug Lynch.
 July 3, 2006 – Traded to the Anaheim Ducks for Joffrey Lupul, Ladislav Šmíd, a first round pick in 2007 (Riley Nash), a 2008 second round pick (traded to New York Islanders, used to select Travis Hamonic) and a conditional first round pick for one of the 2008/2009/2010 drafts (conditions were met in 2008; pick was used to selected Jordan Eberle).
 June 26, 2009 – Traded to the Philadelphia Flyers along with Ryan Dingle for Joffrey Lupul, Luca Sbisa and Philadelphia's first-round pick in the 2009 NHL Entry Draft (later traded to Columbus, which selected John Moore) and the 2010 NHL Entry Draft (used to select Emerson Etem), and a conditional pick for either the 2010 NHL Entry Draft or the 2011 NHL Entry Draft (conditions were not satisfied).
 June 27, 2015 – Traded to the Arizona Coyotes along with Nicklas Grossmann for Sam Gagner and a conditional pick in either the 2016 or 2017 NHL Entry Draft.

See also
List of NHL players with 1,000 games played

Notes

External links

 
"Captain Crunch's Time Has Come", The Toronto Sun, February 1, 1998.

*NOTE: Al MacInnis served as captain for nearly the entire 2002–03 NHL season, while Pronger was injured and out of the line-up. Pronger resigned the captaincy at the start of the 2003–04 NHL season, in favour of MacInnis.

1974 births
Anaheim Ducks players
Anaheim Ducks captains
Canadian expatriate ice hockey players in the United States
Canadian ice hockey defencemen
Canadian people of Finnish descent
Edmonton Oilers players
Florida Panthers executives
Hart Memorial Trophy winners
Hartford Whalers draft picks
Hartford Whalers players
Hockey Hall of Fame inductees
Ice hockey people from Ontario
Ice hockey players at the 1998 Winter Olympics
Ice hockey players at the 2002 Winter Olympics
Ice hockey players at the 2006 Winter Olympics
Ice hockey players at the 2010 Winter Olympics
James Norris Memorial Trophy winners
Living people
Medalists at the 2002 Winter Olympics
Medalists at the 2010 Winter Olympics
National Hockey League All-Stars
National Hockey League first-round draft picks
Olympic gold medalists for Canada
Olympic ice hockey players of Canada
Olympic medalists in ice hockey
People from Chesterfield, Missouri
People from Dryden, Ontario
People from Irvine, California
Peterborough Petes (ice hockey) players
Philadelphia Flyers captains
Philadelphia Flyers players
Sportspeople from Orange County, California
St. Louis Blues players
Stanley Cup champions
Triple Gold Club